Phrynarachne rothschildi is a species of spiders of the family Thomisidae. It is endemic to Sri Lanka.

References

Thomisidae
Spiders of Asia
Endemic fauna of Sri Lanka
Spiders described in 1903
Taxa named by R. I. Pocock